Robert John Whittaker (born 20 December 1990) is an Australian professional mixed martial artist. He currently competes in the Middleweight division in the Ultimate Fighting Championship (UFC), where he is a former UFC Middleweight Champion.  A professional MMA competitor since 2009, Whittaker was a contestant on the first series of The Ultimate Fighter: The Smashes and won the welterweight tournament. Whittaker became interim middleweight champion after winning the title at UFC 213; he was promoted to undisputed champion after Georges St-Pierre vacated the UFC Middleweight Championship in 2017. As of January 24, 2023, he is #14 in the UFC men's pound-for-pound rankings, and as of November 15, 2022, he is #2 in the UFC middleweight rankings.

Background
Whittaker was born at Middlemore Hospital in Ōtāhuhu, Auckland, New Zealand. His father is an Australian of European descent and his mother is of Māori and Samoan descent. Moving to Australia shortly after, Whittaker's father enrolled Robert, aged seven, and his brother in a Goju-ryu Karate school, to encourage them in self-discipline and self-defence. After training in the discipline for a little over eight years, and earning his black belt, his father offered him the chance to change to another sport or drop karate entirely. While his brother decided to drop out, Robert chose to switch to a Hapkido gym run by Henry Perez, following his move to Menai. Not long afterwards, Perez transformed his gym into an MMA gym. Having no other choice, Whittaker began training in MMA and was immediately hooked, choosing MMA as his preferred sport over rugby league.

Whittaker prefers not to engage in trash-talk outside of the octagon. As he puts it:

Mixed martial arts career

Early career
In 2008 Whittaker signed with Australia's Xtreme Fighting Championships and made his debut 14 March 2009 against fellow pro debutant Chris Tallowin. Whittaker won the fight via TKO in the first round. Whittaker continued his career with Cage Fighting Championships, going 6-0 inside the promotion from 2009 to 2011, with a notable win over fellow TUF: Smashes cast member, Ben Alloway.

On 30 October 2011 Whittaker lost his first fight when he travelled to Cotai, Macau for Legend Fighting Championships 6: he fought Hoon Kim and lost via submission in the first round. Whittaker bounced back from the loss and won two consecutive bouts before suffering his second loss to Jesse Juarez, which brought his overall record to 9–2.

Ultimate Fighting Championship

The Ultimate Fighter
In 2012, Whittaker's coach, Henry Perez, put him forward for the first series of The Ultimate Fighter: The Smashes, which pitted a team of eight Australians against a team of eight men from the United Kingdom, and he was selected as one of the cast members.

In his first fight on the show, Whittaker fought Luke Newman. Whittaker landed a punch flush on the chin of Newman after 19 seconds, knocking him unconscious for several minutes. The win moved him onto the semifinal round. The knockout also earned Whittaker an additional $25,000 for "Knockout of the Season".

In the semifinal, Whittaker was matched against replacement fighter and fellow Team Australia teammate, Xavier Lucas. Whittaker won via knockout at 1:17 in the first round. The win moved Whittaker into the final round of the competition, which would take place live on UFC on FX: Sotiropoulos vs. Pearson.

Early UFC fights
Whittaker made his UFC debut on 15 December 2012 at UFC on FX 6, which was also known as "The Ultimate Fighter: The Smashes Finale". He would fight Brad Scott to determine the welterweight winner of The Ultimate Fighter: The Smashes. Whittaker won the fight via unanimous decision to become the first winner of The Ultimate Fighter: The Smashes alongside Norman Parke, who was the lightweight winner.

Whittaker faced Colton Smith on 25 May 2013 at UFC 160. He won the fight by TKO in the third round.

Whittaker faced Court McGee on 28 August 2013 at UFC Fight Night 27. He lost the fight via split decision.

Whittaker was expected to face Brian Melancon on 7 December 2013 at UFC Fight Night 33.  However, Melancon pulled out of the bout citing an injury and subsequently retired.  As a result, Whittaker was removed from the card.

Whittaker faced Stephen Thompson on 22 February 2014 at UFC 170. He lost the fight via TKO in the first round. 

Whittaker faced Mike Rhodes on 28 June 2014 at UFC Fight Night 43. He won the fight via unanimous decision.

Move to middleweight 
Whittaker faced Clint Hester in a middleweight bout on 8 November 2014 at UFC Fight Night 55. He won the back-and-forth fight via TKO in the second round.  The win also earned Whittaker his first Fight of the Night bonus award.

Whittaker faced Brad Tavares on 10 May 2015 at UFC Fight Night 65. He won the fight via knockout in the first round.  The win also earned Whittaker his first Performance of the Night bonus award.

Whittaker was expected to face Michael Bisping on 15 November 2015 at UFC 193. However, Bisping pulled out of the fight on 30 September, citing an elbow injury, and was replaced by Uriah Hall. Whittaker defeated Hall by unanimous decision (30–27, 30–27, and 29–28).

Whittaker next faced Rafael Natal on 23 April 2016 at UFC 197. Whittaker won the back and forth fight via unanimous decision.

Whittaker faced Derek Brunson on 27 November 2016 at UFC Fight Night 101. He won the back and forth fight via first-round TKO. The win also earned him the Performance of the Night and  the Fight of the Night bonus awards.

Whittaker faced Ronaldo Souza on 15 April 2017 at UFC on Fox 24. He won by second-round TKO and in the process became the first person to finish Souza since 2008. The win also earned Whittaker his third Performance of the Night bonus award.

UFC Middleweight Champion
Whittaker fought for the interim middleweight title against Yoel Romero on 8 July 2017 at UFC 213, after Michael Bisping announced a nagging knee injury which would go on to keep him on the sidelines for several months. Whittaker won by unanimous decision, and became the first Australian and first New Zealand born fighter to hold a UFC title. This win earned him the  Fight of the Night bonus award. He missed the remainder of 2017, as he was recovering from a medial knee injury to his left leg.

On 7 December 2017, then middleweight champion Georges St-Pierre vacated the title after being diagnosed with colitis. As a result, Whittaker was promoted to undisputed champion. He was slated for his first title defence at UFC 221 against former middleweight champion Luke Rockhold on 10 February 2018 at Perth Arena in Australia. On 13 January 2018,  it was reported that Whittaker had pulled out of the event due to an undisclosed injury and would be replaced by Yoel Romero for the interim middleweight championship. The winner of this bout would then face Whittaker in a unification bout. On 20 January 2018, Dana White confirmed that Whittaker was in a serious condition after he was not properly treated from a staph infection in his stomach.

A rematch with Romero took place on 9 June 2018 at UFC 225.  At the weigh-ins, Romero missed weight, coming in at 186 lbs, 1 pound over the middleweight limit for a title fight. Romero was given additional time to make weight, but he weighed in at 185.2 lbs, 0.2 lbs over the title fight limit. Romero was fined 20% of his fight purse and the fight was contested as a non-title catchweight bout. Whittaker won the fight by a close split decision. Their fight was awarded with 'Fight of The Night' honours. As Romero had failed to make weight, Whittaker received a $100,000 bonus, which would normally have been shared by both fighters.

In July 2018, the UFC announced that Whittaker and Kelvin Gastelum had been selected as coaches for Ultimate Fighter 28. On 2 November 2018, it was announced that Whittaker's next middleweight title defence would be against Kelvin Gastelum, in  February at UFC 234. However, Whittaker pulled out of the event a few hours beforehand after he was forced to undergo emergency dual surgery immediately, due to an abdominal hernia of the intestine and a twisted and collapsed bowel.

Whittaker faced Israel Adesanya on 6 October 2019 at UFC 243. He lost the bout and the championship via second-round knockout.

Post UFC Middleweight Championship

Whittaker was scheduled to face Jared Cannonier on 7 March 2020 at UFC 248. However, on 15 January 2020, it was announced Whittaker pulled out of the bout for undisclosed reasons. In late April 2020, Whittaker revealed in an interview that he withdrew from the bout and training altogether due to burnout.

Whittaker faced Darren Till on 26 July 2020 at UFC on ESPN: Whittaker vs. Till. He won the fight via unanimous decision.

Whittaker faced Jared Cannonier on 24 October 2020 at UFC 254. He won the fight via unanimous decision.

Whittaker was scheduled to face Paulo Costa on 17 April 2021 at UFC on ESPN 22. However, on March 16 Costa withdrew from the fight due to illness, and he was replaced by Kelvin Gastelum. Whittaker won the fight via unanimous decision. This fight earned him the Fight of the Night award.

A rematch between Whittaker and Adesanya for the UFC Middleweight Championship took place on 12 February 2022 at UFC 271. Whittaker lost the bout via unanimous decision.

Whittaker was scheduled to face Marvin Vettori June 11, 2022  at UFC 275. However, Whittaker withdrew for undisclosed reasons.  The pair was rescheduled to meet at UFC Fight Night 209 on September 3, 2022. Whittaker won the fight via unanimous decision.

Whittaker was scheduled to face Paulo Costa  on February 12, 2023, at UFC 284. However, Costa disputed the official announcement by the promotion indicating he had never signed a contract and the fight would not take place.

Freestyle wrestling career 
Whittaker began competing in amateur freestyle wrestling tournaments in 2015, when he unexpectedly turned up to compete in the Australia Cup in Canberra. He won each of his three bouts. It was also at the 2015 Australia Cup that Whittaker flagged the possibility of potentially representing Australia in Olympic or Commonwealth wrestling competitions. He returned to the wrestling mat in May 2017 and claimed the Australian National Wrestling Championships gold medal in the 97 kg (213 lbs) division. After winning the national championship, Whittaker entered Australia's 2018 Commonwealth Games 97 kg qualifying tournament in November 2017. He would once again claim first place in his division and in doing so qualified to represent Australia in the 2018 Commonwealth Games on the Gold Coast, the city in which he made his UFC debut. Following his qualification, Whittaker made it clear he would only compete in the Commonwealth Games if the event did not interfere with his UFC commitments. It was confirmed in March 2018 that Whittaker would be one of eight Australians to compete in the Commonwealth Games wrestling competition in April 2018. However, Whittaker was forced to withdraw from the Games less than three weeks from the event in order not to risk being stripped of his UFC championship title, as the UFC was concerned that an injury incurred during the Commonwealth Games would render him unable to compete for the middleweight championship at UFC 225 against Yoel Romero on 9 June 2018.

Championships and accomplishments

General 

 GQ Australia
 2018 GQ Australia Sportsman of the year award

Mixed martial arts 

Ultimate Fighting Championship
UFC Middleweight Championship (one time)
Interim UFC Middleweight Championship (one time, first)
First Australian UFC champion
The Ultimate Fighter: The Smashes Welterweight Tournament Winner
The Ultimate Fighter: The Smashes Knockout of the Season
Fight of the Night (five times) vs. Clint Hester, Derek Brunson, Yoel Romero (2), and Kelvin Gastelum
Performance of the Night (three times) vs. Brad Tavares, Derek Brunson, and Ronaldo Souza
Superfight Australia
Superfight Australia Welterweight Championship (one time)
MMA Mania.com
UFC/MMA 'Fighter of the Year' 2017 - Top 5 List #2
Sherdog
 2017 Fighter of the Year
MMA DNA.nl
 2017 Fighter of the Year
 2018 Fight of the Year.
BJPENN.COM
 Scrap of the Month for June 2018
World MMA Awards
 2017 International Fighter of the Year

Freestyle wrestling 
Australia Cup
Winner - 97 kg (2015)
Australian National Wrestling Championships
Gold medal - 97 kg (2017)
Commonwealth Games
 Qualified - 97 kg (2018)

Personal life 
Whittaker and his wife Sofia have three sons, John, Jack and Jace, and a daughter, Lilliana. Whittaker also has legal guardianship of his younger half sister and brothers Kerehi and Henry Matafeo.

Representing both Australia and New Zealand
Whittaker once stated in an interview, "Pretty much all my mother's side is Kiwi and we have a strong Maori heritage. He said further, "I feel really privileged to have that Maori blood and link to my past. I got my tattoo out of respect to that." Whittaker was born in New Zealand and moved to Australia when he was one month old. As stated in an interview, "My mother wanted to have me back home, so she came back. After I was born we came back to Australia. It's half of who I am, is Maori, and my mum's roots go back to Samoa." When asked about his nationality in an interview with the Australian TV programme The Project, he declared that he had an Australian passport but added that he felt as if he represented both countries as an MMA fighter.

In an interview with GQ Australia, he stated:

Youth clinics for community service 
Whittaker has held clinics for youths in his spare time at his home gym, Gracie jiu-jitsu at Smeaton Grange, and also visited several remote Australian Indigenous youth communities at inland New South Wales. Through this community service, he hopes to inspire the younger generation to take up combat sports by being a good role model to them. Whittaker has said "I want to be a good role model for young up-and-coming athletes, and I want to be a role model to men in general. If I could affect a kid, then this whole journey is amazing. To help them to have some sort of a career path in the sport and fitness industry, and if I could do that for one kid even that would make my day."

Mixed martial arts record

|-
|
|align=center|24–6
|Marvin Vettori
|Decision (unanimous)
|UFC Fight Night: Gane vs. Tuivasa
|
|align=center|3
|align=center|5:00
|Paris, France
|
|-
|Loss
|align=center|23–6
|Israel Adesanya
|Decision (unanimous)
|UFC 271
|
|align=center|5
|align=center|5:00
|Houston, Texas, United States
|
|-
|Win
|align=center|23–5
|Kelvin Gastelum
|Decision (unanimous)
|UFC on ESPN: Whittaker vs. Gastelum
|
|align=center|5
|align=center|5:00
|Las Vegas, Nevada, United States
|
|-
|Win
|align=center|22–5
|Jared Cannonier
|Decision (unanimous)
|UFC 254
|
|align=center| 3
|align=center| 5:00
|Abu Dhabi, United Arab Emirates
|
|-
|Win
|align=center|21–5
|Darren Till
|Decision (unanimous)
|UFC on ESPN: Whittaker vs. Till
|
|align=center|5
|align=center|5:00
|Abu Dhabi, United Arab Emirates
|
|-
|Loss
|align=center|20–5
|Israel Adesanya
|KO (punches) 
|UFC 243 
|
|align=center|2
|align=center|3:33
|Melbourne, Australia
|
|-
|Win
|align=center|20–4
|Yoel Romero
|Decision (split)
|UFC 225
|
|align=center|5
|align=center|5:00
|Chicago, Illinois, United States
|
|-
|Win
|align=center|19–4
|Yoel Romero
|Decision (unanimous)
|UFC 213
|
|align=center|5
|align=center|5:00
|Las Vegas, Nevada, United States
|
|-
|Win
|align=center|18–4
|Ronaldo Souza
|TKO (head kick and punches)
|UFC on Fox: Johnson vs. Reis
|
|align=center|2
|align=center|3:28
|Kansas City, Missouri, United States
|
|-
|Win
|align=center|17–4
|Derek Brunson
|TKO (head kick and punches)
|UFC Fight Night: Whittaker vs. Brunson
|
|align=center|1
|align=center|4:07
|Melbourne, Australia
|
|-
|Win
|align=center|16–4
|Rafael Natal
|Decision (unanimous)
|UFC 197
|
|align=center|3
|align=center|5:00
|Las Vegas, Nevada, United States
|
|-
|Win
|align=center|15–4
|Uriah Hall
|Decision (unanimous)
|UFC 193
|
|align=center|3
|align=center|5:00
|Melbourne, Australia
|
|-
|Win
|align=center| 14–4
|Brad Tavares
|KO (punches)
|UFC Fight Night: Miocic vs. Hunt
| 
|align=center|1
|align=center|0:44
|Adelaide, Australia
|
|-
|Win
|align=center|13–4
|Clint Hester
|TKO (knee and punches)
|UFC Fight Night: Rockhold vs. Bisping
|
|align=center|2
|align=center|2:43
|Sydney, Australia
|
|-
|Win
|align=center|12–4
| Mike Rhodes
|Decision (unanimous)
| UFC Fight Night: Te Huna vs. Marquardt
|
|align=center|3
|align=center|5:00
|Auckland, New Zealand
|
|-
|Loss
|align=center|11–4
|Stephen Thompson
|TKO (punches)
|UFC 170
|
|align=center|1
|align=center|3:43
|Las Vegas, Nevada, United States
|
|-
|Loss
|align=center|11–3
|Court McGee
|Decision (split)
|UFC Fight Night: Condit vs. Kampmann 2
|
|align=center|3
|align=center|5:00
|Indianapolis, Indiana, United States
|
|-
|Win
|align=center|11–2
|Colton Smith
|TKO (punches)
|UFC 160
|
|align=center|3
|align=center|0:41
|Las Vegas, Nevada, United States
|
|-
|Win
|align=center|10–2
|Brad Scott
|Decision (unanimous)
|UFC on FX: Sotiropoulos vs. Pearson
|
|align=center|3
|align=center|5:00
|Gold Coast, Australia
|
|-
|Loss
|align=center|9–2
|Jesse Juarez
|Decision (unanimous)
|Cage Fighting Championships 21
|
|align=center|5
|align=center|5:00
|Sydney, Australia
|
|-
|Win
|align=center|9–1
|Shaun Spooner
|TKO (punches)
|Superfight Australia 13
|
|align=center|1
|align=center|4:01
|Perth, Australia
|
|-
|Win
|align=center|8–1
|Ian Bone
|TKO (punches)
|Cage Fighting Championships 19
|
|align=center|1
|align=center|3:15
|Sydney, Australia
|
|-
|Loss
|align=center|7–1
|Hoon Kim
|Submission (triangle choke)
|Legend Fighting Championship 6
|
|align=center|1
|align=center|3:01
|Macau, SAR, China
|
|-
|Win
|align=center|7–0
|Corey Nelson
|Submission (armbar)
|Cage Fighting Championships 18
|
|align=center|1
|align=center|4:40
|Sydney, Australia
|
|-
|Win
|align=center|6–0
|Ben Alloway
|Submission (rear-naked choke)
|Cage Fighting Championships 17
|
|align=center|1
|align=center|4:07
|Gold Coast, Australia
|
|-
|Win
|align=center|5–0
|Nate Thomson
|Submission (rear-naked choke)
|Cage Fighting Championships 15
|
|align=center|1
|align=center|2:21
|Sydney, Australia
|
|-
|Win
|align=center|4–0
|Jay Cobain
|Submission (armbar)
|Cage Fighting Championships 14
|
|align=center|1
|align=center|0:32
|Sydney, Australia
|
|-
|Win
|align=center|3–0
|Nick Ariel
|KO (punch)
|Cage Fighting Championships 12
|
|align=center|1
|align=center|2:50
|Sydney, Australia
|
|-
|Win
|align=center|2–0
|Richard Walsh
|Submission (rear-naked choke)
|Cage Fighting Championships 11
|
|align=center|1
|align=center|2:40
|Sydney, Australia
|
|-
|Win
|align=center|1–0
|Chris Tallowin
|TKO (punches)
|XFC 14
|
|align=center|1
|align=center|N/A
|Perth, Australia
|

Pay-per-view bouts

Freestyle record 

! colspan="7"| Senior Freestyle Matches
|-
!  Res.
!  Record
!  Opponent
!  Score
!  Date
!  Event
!  Location
|-
! style=background:white colspan=7 |
|-
|Win
|align=center|6–0
|align=left| Christopher Galbraith-Clark
|style="font-size:88%"|Fall
|style="font-size:88%" rowspan=2|November 2017
|style="font-size:88%" rowspan=2|2017 AUS Commonwealth Team Trials 
|style="text-align:left;font-size:88%;" rowspan=2|
 Australia
|-
|Win
|align=center|5–0
|align=left| Nick Verryenne
|style="font-size:88%"|TF 10–0
|-
! style=background:white colspan=7 |
|-
|Win
|align=center|4–0
|align=left| Nick Mann
|style="font-size:88%"|N/A
|style="font-size:88%" |May 2017
|style="font-size:88%" |2017 Australian National Championships 
|style="text-align:left;font-size:88%;" |
 Minto, New South Wales, Australia
|-
! style=background:white colspan=7 |
|-
|Win
|align=center|3–0
|align=left| Christopher Galbraith-Clark
|style="font-size:88%"|TF 14–4
|style="font-size:88%" rowspan=3|July 2015
|style="font-size:88%" rowspan=3|2015 Australia Cup 
|style="text-align:left;font-size:88%;" rowspan=3|
 Canberra, ACT, Australia
|-
|Win
|align=center|2–0
|align=left| Sean Belisle
|style="font-size:88%"|8–2
|-
|Win
|align=center|1–0
|align=left| Don Endermaun
|style="font-size:88%"|TF 13–0
|-

See also
 List of current UFC fighters
 List of male mixed martial artists

References

External links
 
 

1990 births
Living people
Australian sportspeople of Samoan descent
Australian male mixed martial artists
Welterweight mixed martial artists
Middleweight mixed martial artists
The Ultimate Fighter winners
Sportspeople from Sydney
Sportsmen from New South Wales
Australian male karateka
Australian practitioners of Brazilian jiu-jitsu
Samoan practitioners of Brazilian jiu-jitsu
People awarded a black belt in Brazilian jiu-jitsu
Australian hapkido practitioners
Mixed martial artists utilizing hapkido
Mixed martial artists utilizing Gōjū-ryū
Mixed martial artists utilizing freestyle wrestling
Mixed martial artists utilizing Brazilian jiu-jitsu
Australian people of Māori descent
New Zealand emigrants to Australia
Samoan male mixed martial artists
Australian male sport wrestlers
Ultimate Fighting Championship champions
Ultimate Fighting Championship male fighters